This is a list of football clubs located in Malaysia and the leagues and divisions they play in.

Professional league (Malaysian League) 
The professional league is managed by Football Malaysia LLP.

Malaysia Super League (Division 1) 
 2023 season

Malaysia Premier League (Division 2) 
 2022 season

The 2022 season was the final season of the Premier League in its current form, as MFL will be discontinuing the league in favor of an expanded Super League, and a future second-tier league replacing the Premier League.

Semi-professional league

Malaysia M3 League (Division 3) 
 2023 season

Amateur league

Malaysia M4 League (Division 4) 
 2023 season

Malaysia M5 League (Division 5) 
 2023 season

A-Ligue M5 Champions League

A-Ligue Nismilan M5 League

MAHSA-Kronos M5 League

Pahang Amateur League

PBDLMS M5 League

Manjung Football League

Southern Selangor League

Sabak Bernam League

CitiLeague

TMLeague

UNI-League

Kelantan Football League

SLeague M5 Sarawak

Miri M5 League

Mukah M5 League

Former team 

  Brunei
  DPMM FC (2007–08)
  MBJB FC
  Johor Bahru
  Melodi Jaya Sports Club
  MP Muar FC
  SAJ FC 
  JKR Kedah F.C.
  Kedah United F.C.
  Kuala Muda Naza FC
  JKR Kelantan F.C.
  JPS Kelantan F.C.
  SKMK Kelantan F.C.
  TNB Kelantan F.C.
  Tumpat FA
  DBKL
  DRB Hicom
  FELCRA F.C.
  FELDA United
  IKRAM Muda
  KL Kesas FC
  KL Malay Mail F.C.
  Kuala Lumpur Maju United FC
  Protap
  Rapid KL FC
  Semarak 
  Sime Darby F.C.
  Tentera Darat FA
  Tun Razak F.C.
  Young Fighters F.C.
  Harimau Muda A (2008–09, 2011)
  Harimau Muda B
  Harimau Muda C
  KOR RAMD F.C.
  Telekom Malaysia F.C. (1994–2007)
  Melaka United
  Melaka City FC
  SAMB
  NS Betaria FC
  NS Chempaka F.C.
  D'AR Wanderers
  Kuantan FA 
  Marcerra United
  Shahzan Muda
  PBAPP F.C.
  PP Kampung Seronok FC 
  Sinar Dimaja Mai Sarah FC
  Sungai Ara F.C.
  Suria NTFA
  USM FC
  TKN Perak F.C.
  UPB MyTeam
  YBU F.C.
  Northern Lions
  Perlis
  MOF F.C.
  Putrajaya SPA F.C.
  Baverly F.C. 
  Cebagoo F.C.
  DYS F.C. 
  KDMM F.C.
  Kinabalu Jaguar
  Sarawak
  Juara Ban Hoe Leong FC
  MPPJ Selangor F.C.
  Klasiko
  Megah Murni F.C.
  Melawati
  MK Land F.C.
  MPSJ FC
  Penjara
  Petaling Jaya City
  Petaling Jaya Rangers
  PLUS FC
  Proton FC
  Public Bank F.C. (2003–06)
  Real Mulia F.C.
  SUKSES FC
  Thai Selangor
  TUDM Hornet F.C.
  UiTM
  UKM
  LionsXII
  Singapore FA
  Hanelang F.C.
  Kuala Terengganu Rovers
  Terengganu City F.C.

References

Malaysia
 
Clubs
Football clubs